Ukraine International Airlines (UIA) operates scheduled services to Asia, Europe, Africa and North America from its base at Kyiv Boryspil Airport as well as offering domestic flights in Ukraine and additional charter flights.

As a result of the Russian Invasion and the closure of Ukraine Airspace to civilian aircraft all flights are currently suspended.

Destinations

References

Lists of airline destinations